Lentinus sajor-caju (formerly known as Pleurotus sajor-caju) is a species of saprophytic mushroom.

Cultivator-mycologists often incorrectly use the name Pleurotus sajor-caju for some warm weather varieties of Pleurotus pulmonarius, a commonly cultivated species of Oyster Mushroom. The real Pleurotus sajor-caju is a completely separate species of mushroom, which was returned to the genus Lentinus by Pegler in 1975. However, the name Pleurotus sajor-caju has been misapplied so often, even in scientific texts, that confusion about the species name is persistent.

Lentinus sajor-caju (Fr.) Fries. (syn. Pleurotus sajor-caju (Fr.) Sing.) has a distinct veil, a persistent ring on the stipe, and flesh composed of trimitic or dimitic hyphae. P. pulmonarius is monomitic and has a bare stipe.

References

Polyporaceae
Fungi described in 1821
Taxa named by Elias Magnus Fries